Pentatomophaga is a genus of flies in the family Tachinidae.

Species
 Pentatomophaga latifascia (Villeneuve, 1932)

References

Tachinidae